Noguerana is a genus of beetles in the family Cerambycidae, containing the following species:

 Noguerana aliciae Chemsak & Linsley, 1988
 Noguerana rodriguezae Noguera, 2005

References

Trachyderini
Cerambycidae genera